Bonnie Duran is an American public health researcher and Professor in the Schools of Social Work and Public Health. Duran studies the public health of indigenous communities, and has partnered with the Navajo Nation, Indian Health Service and National Congress of American Indians.

Early life and education 
Duran is of Appalousa and Coushatta descent. She was an undergraduate student at San Francisco State University, where she studied health education. She completed a Master of Public Health at the University of California, Berkeley. She remained at the University of California, Berkeley for her graduate studies, where she studied the public health of indigenous communities.

Research and career 
After earning her doctorate Duran joined the University of New Mexico, where she led the Centre for Native American Health. Duran joined the University of Washington in 2007, where she was made associate professor in 2014 and full professor in 2017. She serves as Director of the Center for Indigenous Health Research. Her research considers issues that impact the health of Native Americans and other minority communities in the United States. She has studied the prevalence of mental disorders and the treatment of indigenous women who use Indian Health Service primary career facilities.

In 2018 Duran was selected by the University of California, Berkeley as part of their most influential alumni.

Awards and honours 

 2009 American Public Health Association Tom Bruce Award
 2013 Centers for Disease Control and Prevention “Health Equity Champion
 2016 American Psychological Association Psychologists in Public Service Wayfinder Award
 2018 University of California, Berkeley Most Influential Alumni

Select publications

Books

Personal life 
Duran is a Buddhist mindfulness practitioner. She is part of the Spirit Rock Meditation Center, and teaches on their council.

References 

Living people
Public health researchers
Year of birth missing (living people)
San Francisco State University alumni
UC Berkeley School of Public Health alumni
University of Washington faculty
University of New Mexico faculty